Carex sprengelii, known as Sprengel's sedge and long-beaked sedge, is a sedge with hanging seed heads, native to North America.

Description

Each flowering stem has 1 to 4 spikes of flowers. While flowering, they are crowded at the tip of the stem. The terminal spike is either all male or male with a few female flowers at the bottom. Each spike is on its own stalk (pedicel), and each succeeding spike is shorter than the previous one. As the female flowers develop into seeds (achenes), the stalk droops or nods downwards. The bract enclosing the seed has a long tapered tip (beak), which gives the plant its common name.

References

External links
 

sprengelii
Flora of North America
Flora of Canada
Flora of Eastern Canada
Flora of Western Canada
Flora of the Northwestern United States
Flora of the North-Central United States
Flora of the Northeastern United States
Flora of the South-Central United States